C More Film is a defunct Scandinavian television channel that showed movies from the 1960s, 1970s, 1980s and 1990s.

The sister channel, C More Film 2, started in 2005.

References

External links
Canal+ blir 8 kanaler

Pan-Nordic television channels
Defunct television channels in Denmark
Defunct television channels in Norway
Defunct television channels in Sweden
Defunct television channels in Finland
Television channels and stations established in 2004
Television channels and stations disestablished in 2006